Bruce Hinkley (born 1949) is a Canadian politician who was elected in the 2015 Alberta general election to the Legislative Assembly of Alberta representing the electoral district of Wetaskiwin-Camrose.

Electoral history

2012 general election

2015 general election

References

Alberta New Democratic Party MLAs
Living people
Year of birth uncertain
21st-century Canadian politicians
1949 births